Laguna del Laja is a lake located in the Bío-Bío Region of Chile. The lake borders and gives its name to Laguna del Laja National Park.

References
  

Laja
Lakes of Biobío Region